Lula Carvalho,  (born 1977) is a Brazilian cinematographer. His work includes Elite Squad (2007) and Elite Squad: The Enemy Within (2010), RoboCop (2014) and Teenage Mutant Ninja Turtles (2014). He is the son of cinematographer Walter Carvalho. As of 2018, Carvalho is a member of the American Society of Cinematographers.

Filmography

Features

Shorts
 Atrocidades Maravilhosas (2001, also director)
 Uma Estrela Pra Ioiô (2004)
 Trópico das Cabras (2004)

Documentary
Moacir Arte Bruta (2006)
Fabricando Tom Zé (2006)
Secrets of the Tribe (2010)
Elevado 3.5 (2010)
Carta Para o Futuro (2011, also producer)
Raul - O Início, o Fim e o Meio (2012)TelevisionForça-Tarefa (2011), episodes "Marcas do Passado, Part 1" and "S03E08"Falcón (2011), episode "The Blind Man of Seville"Narcos (2015)The Mechanism'' (2018)

References 

1977 births
Brazilian cinematographers
Living people